Hanna Elizabeth Terry (born 29 November 1990) is an American-born Swedish professional footballer who plays as a forward for Norwegian club Røa IL. She played for the Portland Thorns FC of the National Women's Soccer League. She has represented the Sweden women's national under-23 football team.

College career
She started her career at the University of Utah before transferring to Northeastern University. She was a three-year starting forward for the Northeastern Huskies from 2011 to 2013. The high-point of her soccer career with the Huskies came when she closed her soccer career in 2013 by leading her team to the Colonial Athletic Association tournament title — where she was named the outstanding player — and a berth in the NCAA tournament. The former Huskies captain wrapped up her collegiate career with seven goals and 14 assists, placing her fourth all-time in program history in assists.

Playing career

Club

Portland Thorns
Hanna Terry signed as a free agent for the Portland Thorns on July 25, 2014. Terry made her Thorns FC debut as an amateur player against the Washington Spirit on June 15 as a second-half substitute. She appeared in her first official match a professional as a second-half substitute July 27 at Seattle Reign FC and ended the season having played in two games.

Terry was on the roster for the 2015 season.  On August 21, 2015, the Thorns announce the release of Hanna Terry for unspecified reasons.  In her second season for Thorns FC in 2015, Terry, 24, appeared in six matches, logging 131 minutes.

She was waived by the Portland Thorns FC in August 2015.

International
Terry was selected to represent Sweden in the Women's U23 Four Nation Tournament in La Manga, Spain in February/March 2013. Terry came on as a substitute for the Swedish team in a game v. the USA U-23 team on March 4, 2013.

Terry, whose mother was born in Sweden, holds dual citizenship in both the United States and Sweden. She pursued a spot on the Swedish national team for much of her soccer career, and her placement on the U23 squad was her first international experience.

Personal life
She is the daughter of actor John Terry.

References

External links
 

1990 births
Living people
People with acquired Swedish citizenship
Swedish women's footballers
Women's association football forwards
QBIK players
IF Limhamn Bunkeflo players
KIF Örebro DFF players
Damallsvenskan players
Swedish expatriate women's footballers
Swedish expatriate sportspeople in Norway
Expatriate women's footballers in Norway
Swedish people of American descent
Soccer players from Santa Monica, California
People from Park City, Utah
Soccer players from Utah
American women's soccer players
Utah Utes women's soccer players
Northeastern Huskies women's soccer players
Portland Thorns FC players
National Women's Soccer League players
American expatriate women's soccer players
American expatriate sportspeople in Norway
American people of Swedish descent
Sweden women's youth international footballers